Marc Berthomieu was a French composer, director and writer born on 9 December 1906 in Marseille. He died on 11 March 1991 in Paris at age 84.

Biography 
Berthomieu studied at Paris Conservatory. He founded the Paris-15th district Conservatory in 1962.

He was awarded a D.M. prize by SACEM, Maurice Ivan Prize by SACD, France Academy Prize, Leo Delibes Prize, Prix Ernest Reyer Prize, Roman Prize, and the Jean Coctot Prize.

Major works 
Robert Macaire

Sacha

La Belle traversée

La Tendre Alyne

5 Nuances

Arcadie

References 

Musicians from Marseille
1906 births
1991 deaths
French film score composers
French operetta composers